The men's triple jump event at the 2008 African Championships in Athletics was held at the Addis Ababa Stadium on May 1.

Results

References
Results (Archived)
Results

2008 African Championships in Athletics
Triple jump at the African Championships in Athletics
2008 in women's athletics